"My People, My Country" (我和我的祖国, literal translation Me and My Motherland/My Motherland and I) is a patriotic lyric song composed by Zhang Li of the Shenyang Conservatory of Music and composed by Qin Yongcheng which debuted in 1985. The lyrics are expressed in the first person, depicting one's love for the motherland. The song was circulated widely after being sung by the famous singer Li Guyi, and remains one of the most popular songs in the country. On the occasion of the 70th anniversary of the founding of the People's Republic of China, "Me and My Motherland" sang all over the country. This song has been shortlisted for 100 patriotic songs recommended by the Central Propaganda Department and 100 excellent songs celebrating the 70th anniversary of the founding of the People's Republic of China.

History
Composed in 1983 within 20 minutes by Qin Yongcheng, this song didn't receive its lyrics until 1984, a delay of over half a year until the lyricist Zhang Li went on a trip to Zhangjiajie. The natural beauty of the land struck the Zhang, providing the inspiration needed, whereupon he completed the lyrics for the song. Based on mountains and rivers, lakes and seas, and one's love to the motherland, this song expresses the natural beauty of China, epitomizing one's relationship with their motherland.

Li Guyi was chosen to sing the debut of this song in 1984, and performed this song all over China. This song was an instant hit, and was added to the music curriculum for vocal students in China. This song remains popular to this very day, and has been frequently performed in China and internationally.

This song was chosen to be the theme song of the homonymic film My People, My Country (2019), which was released on 30 September 2019. It also became an unofficial anthem in China, especially during and after the 70th anniversary of the People's Republic of China. Flash mobs sung this song in major places across China in 2019, including Beijing Capital International Airport, Shenzhen North station, Sansha, and many other places, totalling a viewership of over 600 million people. Chinese Communist Party general secretary Xi Jinping mentioned this song in his 2020 new year address, stating how this "ode to a new China" was sung throughout China, the paradigm of the patriotic spirit of China, inspiring the Chinese to work harder.

In the opening ceremony of the 2022 Beijing Winter Olympics, the song was played during the entrance of the National flag of China.

Music
This song uses a "downward" tune, and is in a metre of six or nine beats.

Below is the music for the first stanza.

Lyrics

References

External links

1985 songs
Chinese songs
Chinese patriotic songs